The Bloomsburg Blue Jays were a minor league baseball team based in Bloomsburg, Pennsylvania. In 1897, the Blue Jays played as members of the Central Pennsylvania League, placing 2nd in their only season of play, as the league permanently folded following the 1897 season.

History
In the 1897 season, the Bloomsburg Blue Jays began play in the reformed six–team Class F level Central Pennsylvania League. Bloomsburg joined the Milton, Posttville, Shamokin Reds, Sunbury Railroaders and Williamsport Demorest teams in beginning league play on May 15, 1887. The Bloomsburg team was also referred to as the "Bluebirds."

In 1897 Central Pennsylvania League play, the Blue Jays ended the season with a record of 44–47. Managed by Pop Watts, Bloomsburg placed 2nd in the final overall standings, finishing 14.0 games behind the 1st place Milton team. Bloomsburg tied with Shamokin Reds/Lock Haven Maroons (45–48) for 2nd place. The league held no playoffs.

Future major league players Bert Conn, Bill Hallman, Red Owens and Bill Rotes played for the Bloomsburg Blue Jays.

The Central Pennsylvania League did not return to play following the 1897 season. Bloomsburg, Pennsylvania has not hosted another minor league team.

The ballpark
The name of the Bloomsburg home minor league ballpark in 1897 is unknown.

Year–by–year record

Notable alumni

Albert K. Aldinger (1897)
Bert Conn (1897)
Bill Hallman (1897)
Red Owens (1897)
Bill Rotes (1897)

See also
Bloomsburg Blue Jays players

References

External links
 Baseball Reference

Defunct minor league baseball teams
Baseball teams established in 1897
Baseball teams disestablished in 1897
1897 establishments in Pennsylvania
1897 disestablishments in Pennsylvania
Defunct baseball teams in Pennsylvania
Bloomsburg–Berwick metropolitan area
Central Pennsylvania League teams